Harrison Keddie (born 10 July 1996) is a Welsh rugby union player who plays for the Dragons regional team as a flanker. He is a Wales under-20 international.

Keddie made his debut for Dragons regional team in 2015 having previously played for the Dragons academy, Cross Keys RFC and Ebbw Vale RFC. In January 2018 he signed a new 3 year contract with the Dragons.

References

External links 
Dragons profile

1996 births
Living people
Cross Keys RFC players
Dragons RFC players
Ebbw Vale RFC players
People from Magor, Monmouthshire
Rugby union players from Monmouthshire
Welsh rugby union players
Rugby union flankers
Rugby union number eights